Ralph Pappier (16 January 1914 in Shanghai – 17 August 1998 in Buenos Aires) was an Argentine production designer, set decorator and film director.

Career
Pappier was most prolific in Argentine cinema in the 1940s, and  contributed to a range of acclaimed films during the period. He was production designer for the Silver Condor Award for Best Film award-winning  The Gaucho War (1942) and Best Cinematography winner Three Men of the River (1943), and director of the Silver Condor for Best Film winning films School of Champions (1950) and Caballito criollo (1953). He was also cinematographer for the 1945 film Circus cavalcade. The Argentine Academy of Cinematography Arts and Sciences gave him awards for Best Scenography for En el viejo Buenos Aires (1942) and  Su mejor alumno (1944).

Filmography

Director 

 Esquiú, una luz en el sendero (1965)
 Allá donde el viento brama (inédita - 1963)
 Operación "G" (1962)
 Delito (1962)
 El festín de Satanás (1955)
 La morocha (1955)
 Caballito criollo (1953)
 Escuela de campeones (1950)
 El último payador (1950)
 My Poor Beloved Mother (1948)

Scenography 

 El último payador (1950)
 Las aventuras de Jack (1949)
 La otra y yo (1949)
 Pobre, mi madre querida (1948)
 La serpiente de cascabel (1948)
 El precio de una vida (1947)
 La cumparsita (1947)
 Madame Bovary (1947)
 Los hijos del otro (1947)
 Musical Romance (1947)
 Cumbres de hidalguía (1947)
 María Rosa (1946)
 The Circus Cavalcade (1945)
 Cuando la primavera se equivoca (1944)
 Su mejor alumno (1944)
 Eclipse de sol (1943)
 Cuando florezca el naranjo (1943)
 Los hijos artificiales (1943)
 Tres hombres del río (1943)
 La Guerra Gaucha (1942)
 El gran secreto (1942)
 En el viejo Buenos Aires (1942)
 El viejo Hucha (1942)
 Cruza (1942)
 En el último piso (1942)
 Yo quiero morir contigo (1941)
 The Gaucho Priest (1941)
 El mozo número 13 (1941)
 La quinta calumnia (1941)
 Volver a vivir (1941)
 Chingolo (1940)
 La carga de los valientes (1940)
 Encadenado (1940)
 El hijo del barrio (1940)
 Corazón de turco (1940)
 Prisioneros de la tierra (1939)
 Atorrante (La venganza de la tierra) (1939)
 Nativa (1939)
 ...Y los sueños pasan (1939)

References

External links 
 

1914 births
1998 deaths
Argentine production designers
Argentine set decorators
Argentine film directors
Argentine art directors
Argentine expatriates in France
Chinese emigrants to Argentina